Persikas (stand for Persatuan Sepakbola Indonesia Kabupaten Semarang) or Persikas Semarang Regency is an Indonesian football club based in Semarang Regency, Central Java. They currently compete in Liga 3.

References

External links
Liga-Indonesia.co.id

Football clubs in Indonesia
Football clubs in Central Java
Association football clubs established in 1967
1967 establishments in Indonesia